Malkamäki is a Finnish surname that may refer to
Aino Malkamäki (1894–1961), Finnish schoolteacher and politician
Juho Malkamäki (1844–1928), Finnish farmer, lay preacher and politician
Miko Malkamäki (born 1988), Finnish ice hockey defenceman 

Finnish-language surnames